Bencode (pronounced like Bee-encode) is the encoding used by the peer-to-peer file sharing system BitTorrent for storing and transmitting loosely structured data.

It supports four different types of values:
 byte strings,
 integers,
 lists, and
 dictionaries (associative arrays).

Bencoding is most commonly used in torrent files, and as such is part of the BitTorrent specification. These metadata files are simply bencoded dictionaries.

Bencoding is simple and (because numbers are encoded as text in decimal notation) is unaffected by endianness, which is important for a cross-platform application like BitTorrent. It is also fairly flexible, as long as applications ignore unexpected dictionary keys, so that new ones can be added without creating incompatibilities.

Encoding algorithm
Bencode uses ASCII characters as delimiters and digits.
 An integer is encoded as i<integer encoded in base ten ASCII>e. Leading zeros are not allowed (although the number zero is still represented as "0"). Negative values are encoded by prefixing the number with a hyphen-minus. Negative zero is not permitted.
 A byte string (a sequence of bytes, not necessarily characters) is encoded as <length>:<contents>. The length is encoded in base 10, like integers, but must be non-negative (zero is allowed); the contents are just the bytes that make up the string. The specification does not deal with encoding of characters outside the ASCII set; to mitigate this, some BitTorrent applications explicitly communicate the encoding (most commonly UTF-8) in various non-standard ways. This is identical to how netstrings work, except that netstrings additionally append a comma suffix after the byte sequence.
 A list of values is encoded as l<contents>e . The contents consist of the bencoded elements of the list, in order, concatenated. A list consisting of the string "spam" and the number 42 would be encoded as: .  Note the absence of separators between elements, and the first character is the letter 'l', not digit '1'.
 A dictionary is encoded as d<contents>e. The elements of the dictionary are encoded with each key immediately followed by its value. All keys must be byte strings and must appear in lexicographical order. A dictionary that associates the values 42 and "spam" with the keys "foo" and "bar", respectively (in other words, }), would be encoded as follows: .
There are no restrictions on what kind of values may be stored in lists and dictionaries; they may (and usually do) contain other lists and dictionaries. This allows for arbitrarily complex data structures to be encoded.

Features & drawbacks
Bencode is a very specialized kind of binary coding with some unique properties:

 For each possible (complex) value, there is only a single valid bencoding; i.e. there is a bijection between values and their encodings. This has the advantage that applications may compare bencoded values by comparing their encoded forms, eliminating the need to decode the values.
 Many BE codegroups can be decoded manually. Since the bencoded values often contain binary data, decoding may become quite complex. Bencode is not considered a human-readable encoding format.
 Bencoding serves similar purposes as data languages like JSON and YAML, allowing complex yet loosely structured data to be stored in a platform independent way.

However, this uniqueness can cause some problems:

 There are very few bencode editors
 Because bencoded files contain binary data, and because of some of the intricacies involved in the way binary strings are typically stored, it is often not safe to edit bencode files in text editors.

See also
BitTorrent

References

External links
 Bencoding specification
 File_Bittorrent2 - Another PHP Bencode/decode implementation
 The original BitTorrent implementation in Python as standalone package
 Torrent File Editor cross-platform GUI editor for BEncode files
 bencode-tools - a C library for manipulating bencoded data and a XML schema like validator for bencode messages in Python
 Bento - Bencode library in Elixir.
 Beecoder - the file stream parser that de/encoding "B-encode" data format on Java using java.io.* stream Api.
 Bencode parsing in Java
 Bencode library in Scala
 Bencode parsing in C
 There are numerous Perl implementations on CPAN

BitTorrent
Data serialization formats